Boris Abelevich Kaufman, A.S.C. (August 24, 1906 – June 24, 1980) was a Russian-born American cinematographer and the younger brother of Soviet filmmakers Dziga Vertov and Mikhail Kaufman.

Life and career
Kaufman was born into a family of Jewish intellectuals in Białystok when Congress Poland was part of the Russian Empire. After the Bolshevik Revolution of 1917, Poland regained its independence, and Boris moved there with his parents. Mikhail and Denis, better known as Dziga Vertov, stayed in the Soviet Union and became important filmmakers, producing avant-garde and agitprop films. The brothers later stayed in touch primarily by letters; Vertov visited Boris Kaufman in Paris twice, in 1929 and 1931.

After graduating from the University of Paris, Kaufman turned to cinematography, collaborating with Jean Vigo and Dimitri Kirsanoff. During World War II, he served in the French Army against the Nazis; when France fell, Kaufman escaped to Canada. After working briefly with John Grierson for the National Film Board of Canada, he moved to the United States in 1942.

Kaufman supported himself by filming short subjects and documentaries until director Elia Kazan chose him as director of photography for On the Waterfront (1954), Kaufman's first American feature film, for which he won an Academy Award for Best Cinematography (Black and White) and a 1955 Golden Globe Award. For Kazan's Baby Doll (1956), he received a second Oscar nomination. Kaufman was director of photography for Sidney Lumet's first film, 12 Angry Men (1957), and The Pawnbroker (1964). Retiring in 1970, he died in New York City in 1980.

Selected filmography

References

External links

Boris Kaufman Papers. General Collection, Beinecke Rare Book and Manuscript Library, Yale University.

1906 births
1980 deaths
University of Paris alumni
Polish cinematographers
American people of Polish-Jewish descent
American people of Russian-Jewish descent
People from Białystok
Best Cinematographer Academy Award winners
Polish emigrants to France
French emigrants to the United States